The Best of Do As Infinity is the sixth compilation album released by Do As Infinity. It was released on the band's 15th anniversary. This album has 30 songs, including two new songs. There are two versions of this album, one with two CDs and the other with two CDs and a DVD.

Track listing

Charts

External links
 The Best of Do As Infinity (CD) at Oricon 
 The Best of Do As Infinity (CD+DVD) at Oricon 

Do As Infinity albums
2014 greatest hits albums
2014 video albums
Avex Group compilation albums